Left-hand–right-hand activity chart is an illustration that shows the contributions of the right and left hands of a worker and the balance of the workload between the right and left hands. The chart is a very effective method to analyze the work done by a single worker and it is very helpful in improving the work done by the worker.

References

Further reading 
Aft, L. S. (2000). Work measurements and methods improvement, Wiley, .

Industrial engineering